Peace Breaker is a 2017 Chinese action thriller film directed by Lien Yi-chi and written by David Lin and Johnny Yu, and starring Aaron Kwok, Wang Qianyuan, Liu Tao, Yu Ailei, Feng Jiayi, and Zheng Kai. It is a remake of Kim Seong-hun's A Hard Day. The film premiered in China on 17 August 2017.

Plot
Gao Jianxiang (Aaron Kwok) is a Malaysian Chinese corrupt policeman in Kuala Lumpur. He kills a pedestrian on the way to his mother's funeral. To escape responsibility, in a moment of desperation, Gao hides the body in his trunk, and then his own mother's coffin. He thinks that his life could return to calmness, but unexpectedly, the pedestrian who was killed by him was a wanted man, and Gao is also eyed by the police. Shortly afterwards, a mysterious phone call is made to him. He realizes that all this is a conspiracy and he is already in deep trouble.

Cast
 Aaron Kwok as Gao Jianxiang, a Malaysian Chinese policeman in Kuala Lumpur.
 Wang Qianyuan as Chen Changmin, a Malaysian Chinese policeman who is corrupt.
 Liu Tao as Lin Xiaoye, Gao Jianxiang's wife, they have a daughter named Weiwei.
 Yu Ailei
 Feng Jiayi as Captain Guo, Gao Jianxiang's superior.
 Zheng Kai

Soundtrack

Production
The film took place in Kuala Lumpur, Malaysia.

Release
The film was originally to be released on August 18, 2017 but advanced to August 17.

References

External links
 
 

2017 films
Chinese action thriller films
Chinese crime thriller films
Chinese remakes of South Korean films
2017 action thriller films
2017 crime thriller films
Police detective films
Chinese detective films
Films set in Kuala Lumpur
Films shot in Kuala Lumpur
2010s Mandarin-language films